The 1900 Utah gubernatorial election was held on November 6, 1900. Incumbent Republican Heber Manning Wells defeated Democratic nominee James Moyle with 51.98% of the vote.

General election

Candidates
Heber Manning Wells, Republican 
James Moyle, Democratic

Results

References

1900
Utah
Gubernatorial